Yevgeniya Nikolayevna Kolodko (born 22 July 1990) is a Russian shot putter.

Career
Kolodko was initially awarded the bronze medal in the shot put competition at the 2012 Summer Olympics in London, upgraded to silver on the disqualification of Nadzeya Ostapchuk, after recording her personal best of 20.48 m. In 2016, she was stripped of the medal after reanalysis of her samples from the event resulted in a positive test for the prohibited substances turinabol and ipamorelin.

Kolodko won silver medals at the 2013 European Athletics Indoor Championships in Gothenburg (disqualified in 2017) and at the 2014 European Athletics Championships in Zurich.

Personal life
Kolodko was born on 22 July 1990 in Neryungri, Siberia. In September 2015, she married the Canadian shot putter Dylan Armstrong, whom she had dated since 2012.

International competitions

See also

List of doping cases in athletics
List of stripped Olympic medals
List of European Athletics Championships medalists (women)
List of European Athletics Indoor Championships medalists (women)
Russia at the World Athletics Championships
Doping in Russia
Doping at the Olympic Games
Doping at the World Athletics Championships

References

1990 births
Living people
People from Neryungrinsky District
Sportspeople from Sakha
Russian female shot putters
Olympic female shot putters
Olympic athletes of Russia
Athletes (track and field) at the 2012 Summer Olympics
Competitors stripped of Summer Olympics medals
World Athletics Championships athletes for Russia
European Athletics Championships medalists
Russian Athletics Championships winners
Doping cases in athletics
Russian sportspeople in doping cases